Zina is a given name. Notable people with the name include:

Zina, pseudonym for Linda Aslaksen (born 1986), Norwegian Sámi artist and educator 
Zina Andrianarivelo-Razafy (born 1951), Madagascan diplomat
Zina Bethune (born 1945), American actress, dancer and choreographer
Zina D. H. Young (1821–1901), American social activist and religious leader
Zina Garrison (born 1963), American tennis player
Zina Goldrich (born 1964), musical theater composer
Zina Kocher (born 1982), Canadian biathlete
Zina Pitcher (1797–1872), American physician, politician and academic administrator
Zina Saunders (born 1953), Manhattan-based artist-writer

See also
Zena (given name)